Rhythmagick is the debut solo album by percussionist Aïyb Dieng, it was released in 1995 by P-Vine Records.

Track listing

Personnel 
Musicians
Bootsy Collins – bass guitar, guitar
Carlos Cordova – batá
Aïyb Dieng – bass drum, batá, chatan, congas, talking drum, producer
Trilok Gurtu – drums, tabla
Umar Bin Hassan – voice
Bill Laswell – bass guitar, sampler, producer
Daniel Ponce – batá, congas
Pharoah Sanders – tenor saxophone, flute
Nicky Skopelitis – six-string guitar, twelve-string guitar
Bernie Worrell – Hammond organ, clavinet
Technical personnel
Mati Klarwein – cover art
Thi-Linh Le – photography
Layng Martine – assistant engineer
Robert Musso – engineering
Aldo Sampieri – design

Release history

References

External links 
 

1995 albums
Subharmonic (record label) albums
P-Vine Records albums
Albums produced by Bill Laswell